Callionima falcifera is a moth of the family Sphingidae first described by Bruno Gehlen in 1943. It is known from Mexico, Belize, Nicaragua, Costa Rica and Jamaica, south through northern South America (north-western and eastern Venezuela).

Description 
The wingspan is 68–73 mm.

Biology 
The larvae feed on Stemmadenia obovata and probably other Apocynaceae species.

References

F
Moths of Central America
Sphingidae of South America
Moths described in 1943